Camélia Jordana Aliouane (born 15 September 1992) is a French-Algerian pop singer. She rose to fame after participating in the television show Nouvelle Star, the French version of Pop Idol, in 2009, where she came in second.

Life and career
Jordana was born on 15 September 1992 in Toulon, to French parents of Algerian descent. Her father Hachemi is of Berber Kabyle origin and her mother Zélihka is from Oran. She grew up in La Londe-les-Maures with her older sister and younger brother.

At the age of sixteen, she decided to audition for the seventh season of Nouvelle Star in Marseille, and managed to convince the jury with her version of Louis Armstrong's What a wonderful world. She finished in third place. After her elimination, she signed a record deal with Sony Music and released her eponymous debut album on 29 March 2010. It sold 10,169 copies in its first week and managed to enter the French SNEP Album Chart at #9.

Although Jordana's debut single Non Non Non (Écouter Barbara) was only released as download single in France, it peaked at #3 on the French digital chart. It also charted at #3 in Belgium and #48 in Switzerland.

She participated in a song for the album So in Love by Nouvelle Star judge André Manoukian in April 2010.

Jordana was interviewed and played several songs on the TV5Monde programme 'Acoustic' on 7 November 2010.

She was on the jury of the Semaine de la Critique section at the 2021 Cannes Film Festival.

Philanthropy 
On 27 November 2015, Jordana participated together with Nolwenn Leroy and Yael Naim at the national memorial day for the victims of the November 2015 Paris attacks singing the song “Quand on n'a que l'amour” by Jacques Brel.

Controversies 
As a presentation of her new double album, Facile x fragile, she told L'Obs that "white men" are, in the collective unconscious, responsible for all the evils of the earth. The International League against Racism and Anti-Semitism denounces this declaration, which it considers "unconscious".

Discography

Singles

Filmography

References

External links

 

1992 births
Artists from Toulon
French people of Kabyle descent
Living people
Nouvelle Star participants
Musicians from Toulon
21st-century French singers
21st-century French women singers
Most Promising Actress César Award winners